Simon Francis Curran  (October 30, 1874 – May 19, 1936) was a Major League Baseball pitcher. He played for the Boston Beaneaters of the National League in one game on August 1, 1902. Previously he played at Tufts University.

External links
Baseball Reference.com page

1874 births
1936 deaths
Boston Beaneaters players
Major League Baseball pitchers
Baseball players from Massachusetts
Manchester Manchesters players
Norwich Witches players